American songwriter/producer Walter Afanasieff has been credited with composing, producing, arranging, performing on or programming one or more tracks on the following albums or singles:

See also
List of songs written by Walter Afanasieff

Afanasieff, Walter